Jeannie Carson (born Jean Shufflebottom; 23 May 1928) is a British-born retired comedian, actress, singer, and dancer. She has a star on the Hollywood Walk of Fame.

Early life
Born to show business parents, Carson was born as Jean Shufflebottom in Pudsey, West Riding of Yorkshire. In her early British films, she performed under the name Jean Carson, but later changed her given name to "Jeannie" to avoid confusion with the similarly named American actress Jean Carson.

Acting career
Carson had an early role in A Date with a Dream (1948). In 1949 she was a principal boy at the Theatre Royal in Birmingham. She left Birmingham and was cast as the head of the chorus in Noel Coward's Ace of Clubs. In 1951 she went into a musical, Latin Quarter at London casino.

Carson acted in Love from Judy on stage in London. This debuted in 1951 and was a huge success running until 1953; the BBC broadcast a film version. Carson was also in the film Love in Pawn (1953). After producer Max Liebman saw her in Love from Judy, he signed her to a contract to appear on television in the United States, starting with a six-episode color version of the Broadway musical Best Foot Forward and then in a version of Heidi. In January 1953 she released her first recording on the newly formed Philips label "Barrels and Barrels of Roses". 

Carson was in two films for J. Lee Thompson co-starring Diana Dors, As Long as They're Happy (1955) and An Alligator Named Daisy (1955).

In October 1956, John Davis, managing director of Rank, announced her as one of the actors under contract to Rank that Davis thought would become an international star.

In 1956, she starred in her own series Hey, Jeannie!, which aired on CBS. The series lasted one season before being cancelled in 1957, although six new episodes with a revamped format were broadcast in syndication in 1958 with the title The Jeannie Carson Show, and reruns of Hey, Jeannie! were aired in primetime during the summer of 1960, also under the title The Jeannie Carson Show. She appeared as a guest panelist on the February 24, 1957 telecast of What's My Line?. 

In the US Carson guest starred on episodes of Jane Wyman Presents the Fireside Theatre ("A Dangerous Thing"), Wagon Train ("The Annie MacGregor Story" and General Electric Theatre ("Time to Go Now"). On TV she did versions of Little Women, Berkeley Square, and A Kiss for Cinderella.

In Britain Carson was the female lead in Rockets Galore (1958).

In 1960 she was in a short lived revival of Finian's Rainbow on Broadway. Carson appeared in the film Seven Keys (1961) and on TV starred in versions of Quillow and the Gian, What Every Woman Knows, and The Rivals. In 1962 she took over the role of Maria in The Sound of Music on Broadway.

In 1969, she appeared as Marcy Vincente on the soap opera Search for Tomorrow. Oscar-winning actress Anne Revere played her mother and Anthony George played her husband.

In 1970 she was in Blood Red Roses on Broadway.

Personal life

In 1960, Carson married her second husband, actor Biff McGuire, while both were starring in the Broadway revival of Finian's Rainbow. They toured together in 1961 in Camelot, with McGuire as King Arthur and Carson as Guenevere. Later, they performed at the Seattle Repertory for fifteen years, often together.

Filmography
 1948 – A Date with a Dream
 1953 – Love in Pawn
 1955 – As Long as They're Happy
 1955 – An Alligator Named Daisy
 1957 – Rockets Galore! (US title: Mad Little Island)
 1958 – Little Women (CBS Musical) (portraying Jo March) is 
 1961 – Seven Keys
 1964 – My Fair Lady (bit part)

Broadway appearances
 1959-63 – The Sound of Music
 1960    – Finian's Rainbow
 1970    – Blood Red Roses

References

External links

1928 births
Living people
English women comedians
English expatriates in the United States
English musical theatre actresses
English film actresses
English television actresses
People from Pudsey